Mercure can also refer to the chain of hotels run by Accor. See Mercure Hotels.
MERCURE is an atmospheric dispersion modeling CFD code developed by Électricité de France (EDF) and  distributed by ARIA Technologies, a French company.

MERCURE is a version of the CFD software ESTET, developed by EDF's Laboratoire National d'Hydraulique. Thus, it has directly benefited from the improvements developed for ESTET. When requested, ARIA integrates MERCURE as a module into the ARIA RISK software for use in industrial risk assessments.

Features of the model

MERCURE is particularly well adapted to perform air pollution dispersion modelling on local or urban scales. Some of the models capabilities and features are:

Pollution source types: Point or line sources, continuous or intermittent.
Pollution plume types: Buoyant or dense gas plumes.
Deposition: The model is capable of simulating the deposition or decay of plume pollutants.

Users of the model

There are many organizations that have used MERCURE. To name a few:

 Électricité de France (EDF)
 Laboratoire de Mécanique des Fluides et d’Acoustique (LMFA) de l'École Centrale de Lyon, France
 Institut de radioprotection et de sûreté nucléaire (IRSN), Fontenay, France
 The Italian National Agency for New Technology, Energy and the Environment (ENEA), Bologna, Italy
 Queensland University of Technology, Brisbane, Australia

See also

Bibliography of atmospheric dispersion modeling
Atmospheric dispersion modeling
List of atmospheric dispersion models

Further reading

For those who are unfamiliar with air pollution dispersion modelling and would like to learn more about the subject, it is suggested that either one of the following books be read:

 www.crcpress.com
 www.air-dispersion.com

References

External links
 ARIA Technologies web site (English version)
 EDF website (English version)

Atmospheric dispersion modeling
Électricité de France